In the first half of the 8th century CE, a series of battles took place between the Umayyad Caliphate and kingdoms to the east of the Indus river, in the Indian subcontinent.

Subsequent to the Arab conquest of Sindh in present-day Pakistan in 711 CE, Arab armies engaged kingdoms further east of the Indus. Between 724 and 810 CE, a series of battles took place between the Arabs and Nagabhata I of the Gurjara-Pratihara dynasty, Vikramaditya II of the Chalukya dynasty, and other small Indian kingdoms. In the north, Nagabhata of the Pratihara Dynasty defeated a major Arab expedition in Malwa. From the South, Vikramaditya II sent his general Avanijanashraya Pulakeshin, who defeated the Arabs in Gujarat. Later in 776 CE, a naval expedition by the Arabs was defeated by the Saindhava naval fleet under Agguka I.

The Arab defeats led to an end of their eastward expansion, and later manifested in the overthrow of Arab rulers in Sindh itself and the establishment of indigenous Muslim dynasties (Soomras and Sammas) there.

Background

The first Arab invasion of India was an expedition by sea to conquer Thana near Mumbai as early as 636 A.D. It was undertaken during the vigorous expansionist regime of the second Caliph, Umar-bin-Akhtab, who was on a proselytizing mission to spread Islam to all corners of the world. He appointed Usman, of the tribe of Sakif, to capture Bahrain and Oman. Usman sent his brother Hakam to Bahrain and himself proceeded to Oman. Upon reaching Oman, Usman sent a naval expedition to capture Thana on the western coast of India.The Arab army was repulsed decisively and returned to Oman and the first ever Arab raid on India was defeated.

A second naval expedition was sent to conquer Barwas or Barauz (Broach) on the coast of southern Gujarat by Hakam, [Kitab Futuh Al Buldan: Vol. 2, P 209 — Al Baladhuri Tr. By Francis Clark Murgotten] the brother of Usman. This attack too was repelled and the Arabs were driven back successfully.

The third wave of military expansion of the Umayyad Caliphate lasted from 692 to 718 CE. The reign of Al-Walid I (705–715 CE) saw the most dramatic Marwanid Umayyad conquests. In a period of barely ten years, North Africa, Spain, Transoxiana, and Sindh were subdued and colonised. Sindh, controlled by King Raja Dahir of the Rai dynasty, was captured by the Umayyad general Muhammad bin Qasim.  Sindh, now a second-level province of the Caliphate (iqlim) with its capital at Al Mansura, was a suitable base for excursions into India. But, after bin Qasim's departure most of his captured territories were recaptured by Indian kings.

During the reign of Yazid II (720 to 724 CE),  the fourth expansion was launched to all the warring frontiers, including India. The campaign lasted from 720 to 740 CE. During Yazid's times, there was no significant check to the Arab expansion. However, the advent of Hisham ibn Abd al-Malik (r. 691–743 CE), the 10th Umayyad Caliph, saw a turn in the fortune of the Umayyads which resulted in eventual defeat on all the fronts and a complete halt of Arab expansionism. The hiatus from 740 to 750 CE due to military exhaustion, also saw the advent of the third of a series of civil wars, which resulted in the collapse of the Umayyad Caliphate.

Campaign by Muhammad bin Qasim (711–715)

After conquering Brahmanabad in Sindh, Bin Qasim co-opted the local Brahman elite, whom he held in esteem, re-appointing them to posts held under the Brahman dynasty and offering honours and awards to their religious leaders and scholars. This arrangement with local Brahman elites resulted in the continued persecution of Jatts, with Bin Qasim confirming the existing Brahman regulation forbidding them from wearing anything but coarse clothing and requiring them to always walk barefoot accompanied by dogs. The eastern Jats supported the Sind ruler, Dahir, against the Arab invaders, whereas the western Jats aligned with Muhammad bin Qasim against Dahir. Having settled the question of the freedom of religion and the social status of the Brahmans, Muhammad bin al-Qasim turned his attention to the Jats and Lohana.

Significant medieval Muslim chronicles such as the Chach Nama, Zainul-Akhbar and Tarikh-I-Baihaqi have recorded battles between Jats and forces of Muhammad ibn Qasim .

Following his success in Sindh, Muhammad bin Qasim wrote to `the kings of Hind' calling upon them to surrender and accept the faith of Islam. He dispatched a force against al-Baylaman (Bhinmal), which is said to have offered submission. The Mid people of Surast (Maitrakas of Vallabhi) also made peace. Bin Qasim then sent a cavalry of 10,000 to Kanauj, along with a decree from the Caliph. He himself went with an army to the prevailing frontier of Kashmir called panj-māhīyāt (in west Punjab). Nothing is known of the Kanauj expedition. The frontier of Kashmir might be what is referred to as al-Kiraj in later records (Kira kingdom in Kangra Valley, Himachal Pradesh), which was apparently subdued.

Bin Qasim was recalled in 715 CE and died en route.  Al-Baladhuri writes that, upon his departure, the kings of al-Hind had come back to their kingdoms.  The period of Caliph Umar II (r. 717–720) was relatively peaceful. Umar invited the kings of "al-Hind" to convert to Islam and become his subjects, in return for which they would continue to remain kings. Hullishah of Sindh and other kings accepted the offer and adopted Arab names.

Campaign by Al Junayd (723–726)

During the caliphates of Yazid II (r. 720–724) and Hisham (r. 724–743), the expansion policy was resumed. Junayd ibn Abd ar-Rahman al-Murri (or Al Junayd) was appointed the governor of Sindh in 723 CE.

After subduing Sindh, Junayd sent campaigns to various parts of India. The justification was that these parts had previously paid tribute to Bin Qasim but then stopped. The first target was al-Kiraj (possibly Kangra valley), whose conquest effectively put an end to the kingdom. A large campaign was carried out in Rajasthan which included Mermad (Maru-Mada, in Jaisalmer and north Jodhpur), al-Baylaman (Bhillamala or Bhinmal) and Jurz (Gurjara country—southern Rajasthan and northern Gujarat). Another force was sent against Uzayn (Ujjain), which made incursions into its country (Avanti) and some parts of it were destroyed (the city of Baharimad, unidentified). Ujjain itself may not have been conquered. A separate force was also sent against al-Malibah (Malwa, to the east of Ujjain), but the outcome is not recorded.

Towards the North, Umayyads attempted to expand into Punjab but were defeated by Lalitaditya Muktapida of Kashmir.
Another force was dispatched south. It subdued Qassa (Kutch), al-Mandal (perhaps Okha), Dahnaj (unidentified), Surast (Saurashtra) and Barus or Barwas (Bharuch).

The kingdoms weakened or destroyed included the Bhattis of Jaisalmer, the Gurjaras of Bhinmal, the Mauryas of Chittor, the Guhilots of Mewar, the Kacchelas of Kutch, the Maitrakas of Saurashtra and Gurjaras of Nandipuri. Altogether, Al-Junayd might have conquered all of Gujarat, a large part of Rajasthan, and some parts of Madhya Pradesh. Blankinship states that this was a full-scale invasion carried out with the intent of founding a new province of the Caliphate.

In 726 CE, the Caliphate replaced Al-Junayd by Tamim ibn Zaid al-Utbi (Tamim) as the governor of Sindh. During the next few years, all of the gains made by Junayd were lost. The Arab records do not explain why, except to state that the Caliphate troops, drawn from distant lands such as Syria and Yemen, abandoned their posts in India and refused to go back. Blankinship admits the possibility that the Indians must have revolted, but thinks it more likely that the problems were internal to the Arab forces.

Governor Tamim is said to have fled Sindh and died en route. The Caliphate appointed al-Hakam ibn Awana al-Kalbi (Al-Hakam) in 731 who governed till 740.

Al-Hakam and Indian resistance (731–740)
Al-Hakam restored order to Sindh and Kutch and built secure fortifications at Al-Mahfuzah and Al-Mansur. He then proceeded to retake Indian kingdoms previously conquered by Al-Junayd. The Arab sources are silent on the details of the campaigns. However, several Indian sources record victories over the Arab forces.

The  king of Nandipuri, Jayabhata IV, documented, in an inscription dated to 736 CE, that he went to the aid of the king of Vallabhi and inflicted a crushing defeat on a Tājika (Arab) army. The Arabs then overran the kingdom of Jayabhata himself and proceeded on to Navsari in southern Gujarat.
The Arab intention might have been to make inroads into South India. However, to the south of the Mahi River lay the powerful Chalukyan empire. The Chalukyan viceroy at Navsari, Avanijanashraya Pulakeshin, decisively defeated the invading Arab forces as documented in a Navsari grant of 739 CE. The Tājika (Arab) army defeated was, according to the grant, one that had attacked "Kacchella, Saindhava, Saurashtra, Cavotaka, Maurya and Gurjara" kings. Pulakeshin subsequently received the titles "Solid Pillar of Deccan" (Dakshināpatha-sādhāra) and the "Repeller of the Unrepellable" (Anivartaka-nivartayitr). The Rashtrakuta prince Dantidurga, who was subsidiary to Chalukyas at this time, also played an important role in the battle.

The kingdoms recorded in the Navsari grant are interpreted as follows: Kacchelas were the people of Kutch. The Saindhavas are thought to have been emigrants from Sindh, who presumably moved to Kathiawar after the Arab occupation of Sindh in 712 CE.  Settling down in the northern tip of Kathiawar, they had a ruler by the name of Pushyadeva. The Cavotakas (also called Capotaka or Capa) were also associated with Kathiawar, with their capital at Anahilapataka. Saurashtra is south Kathiawar. The Mauryas and Gurjaras are open to interpretation. Blankinship takes them to be the Mauryas of Chittor and Gurjaras of Bhinmal whereas Baij Nath Puri takes them to be a subsidiary line of Mauryas based in Vallabhi and the Gurjaras of Bharuch under Jayabhata IV. In Puri's interpretation, this invasion of the Arab forces was limited to the southern parts of modern Gujarat with several small kingdoms, which was halted by the Chalukyan empire.

Indications are that Al-Hakam was overstretched. An appeal for reinforcements from the Caliphate in 737 is recorded, with 600 men being sent, a surprisingly small contingent. Even this force was absorbed in its passage through Iraq for quelling a local rebellion. The defeat at the hands of Chalukyas is believed to have been a blow to the Arab forces with large costs in men and arms.

The weakened Arab forces were driven out by the subsidiaries of the erstwhile kings. The Guhilot prince Bappa Rawal (r. 734–753) drove out the Arabs who had put an end to the Maurya dynasty at Chittor. A Jain prabandha mentions a king Nahada, who is said to have been the first ruler of his family at Jalore, near Bhinmal, and who came into conflict with a Muslim ruler whom he defeated. Nahada is identified with Nagabhata I (r. 730–760), the founder of the Gurjara-Pratihara dynasty, which is believed to have started from the Jalore-Bhinmal area and spread to Avanti at Ujjain. The Gwalior inscription of the king Bhoja I, says that Nagabhata, the founder of the dynasty, defeated a powerful army of Valacha Mlecchas (foreigners called "Baluchs") around 725 CE. Even though many historians believe that Nagabhata repulsed Arab forces at Ujjain, there is no authentic information about where precisely he encountered them.

Baij Nath Puri states that the Arab campaigns to the east of Indus proved ineffective. However, they had the unintended effect of integrating the Indian kingdoms in Rajasthan and Gujarat. The Chalukyas extended their empire to the north after fighting off the Arabs successfully. Nagabhata I secured a firm position and laid the foundation for a new dynasty, which would rise to become the principal deterrent against Arab expansion. Blankinship also notes that Hakam's campaigns caused the creation of larger, more powerful kingdoms, which was inimical to the caliphate's interests. Al-Hakam died in battle in 740 CE while fighting the Meds of north Saurashtra (Maitrakas, probably under the control of Chalukyas at this time).

Resistance of the Turk Shahis

The Turk Shahi ruler Fromo Kesaro (739-745 CE) appears to have fought vigorously against the Arabs. He seems to have been very successful in this struggle. His coinage suggests that the Arabs were defeated and forced to pay tribute to Fromo Kesaro.

Aftermath
The death of Al-Hakam effectively ended the Arab presence to the east of Sindh. In the following years, the Arabs were preoccupied with controlling Sindh. They made occasional raids to the seaports of Kathiawar to protect their trading routes but did not venture inland into Indian kingdoms. Dantidurga, the Rashtrakuta chief of Berar turned against his Chalukya overlords in 753 and became independent. The Gurjara-Pratiharas immediately to his north became his foes and the Arabs became his allies, due to the geographic logic as well as the economic interests of sea trade. The Pratiharas extended their influence throughout Gujarat and Rajasthan almost to the edge of the Indus river, but their push to become the central power of north India was repeatedly thwarted by the Rashtrakutas. This uneasy balance of power between the three powers lasted till the end of the caliphate.
 
Later in 776 CE, a naval expedition by the Arabs was defeated by the Saindhava naval fleet under Agguka I.

List of major battles
The table below lists some of the major military conflicts during the Arab expeditions in Gujarat and Rajasthan.

See also
 Muslim conquest in the Indian subcontinent
 List of early Hindu Muslim military conflicts in the Indian subcontinent

Notes

References

Bibliography

Further reading
 
 
 

8th-century conflicts
India
Medieval Hinduism
8th century in India
Wars involving India
India